Scott Tiler (Born Scott Schutzman) is an American actor, and acting coach best known for playing the young David "Noodles" Aaronson in Sergio Leone's Once Upon a Time in America (1984).  He then starred in the film adaptation of the literary sequel to Freaky Friday, A Billion for Boris / Billions for Boris.  He also has a turn as Bruce Chalmer in the 1987 teen comedy film Three O'Clock High and in the John Sayles directed movie City of Hope (1987).

Tiler is also an acting coach and stage director.

Filmography

Cinema 

 Once Upon a Time in America, directed by Sergio Leone (1984)
 Billions for Boris, directed by Alexander Grasshoff (1984)
 Time for a Rematch, directed by Phil Joanou (1987)
 Misplaced, directed by Louis Yansen (1989)
 City of Hope, directed by John Sayles (1991)

Short films 

 Rosetta's Blues (2016)
 Your Secret (2016)
 The Blurry World of Marcello Casagrande (2018)

Television 

 Rise and Shine (1981) - Television series
 ABC Weekend Specials (1985) - series
 Flying Blind (1989) - Television series
 New York Undercover (1996) - Television series

References

External links
IMDb 

Living people
American child actors
American male film actors
American male television actors
Acting coaches
Year of birth missing (living people)